The Ambassador of the United Kingdom to Denmark is the United Kingdom's foremost diplomatic representative in Denmark, and head of the UK's diplomatic mission in Denmark.  The official title is His Britannic Majesty's Ambassador to the Kingdom of Denmark.

Until 1947, the British representative in Denmark held the rank of Minister, and the Danish representative in the UK the corresponding rank of Gesandt. In 1947, Denmark and the United Kingdom upgraded their diplomatic representations to each other and both heads of mission have since held the rank of Ambassador.

For Ambassadors from the Court of St. James's to Denmark before 1707, see List of ambassadors of the Kingdom of England to Denmark. For Ambassadors from 1707 to 1800, see List of ambassadors of Great Britain to Denmark.

List of heads of mission

Envoys Extraordinary and Ministers Plenipotentiary of the United Kingdom
1801–1802: No diplomatic relations
1801–1802: Alleyne FitzHerbert, 1st Baron St Helens Plenipotentiary
1802–1805: Francis Hill chargé d'affaires
1803–1804: Robert Liston (special mission)
1805–1807: Benjamin Garlike 
1807: Brook Taylor ad interim
1807: Francis James Jackson ad interim
1807: Anthony Merry
1807–1814: No diplomatic relations
 1813: Alexander Hope and Edward Thornton Plenipotentiaries
 1813–1814: Edward Thornton Plenipotentiary
 1814–1824: Augustus Foster
 1824–1853: Henry Watkin Williams-Wynn
 1852–1853: Henry Holroyd, 3rd Earl of Sheffield (attaché)
 1858: Sir Henry Elliot-Murray-Kynynmound
 1859–1866: Augustus Paget
 1863: John Wodehouse, 3rd Baron Wodehouse
 1866–1869: Hugh MacDonell
 1881–1884: Hon. Hussey Vivian
 1884–1888:  Hon. Edmund Monson
 1888–1893: Hugh MacDonell
 1893–1898: Sir Charles Stewart Scott
 1898–1900: Edmund Fane
 1900–1905: Edward Goschen
 1905–1910: Hon. Sir Alan Johnstone
 1910–1912: Conyngham Greene
 1913–1916: Sir Henry Lowther
 1916–1918: Ralph Spencer Paget
 1919–1921: Sir Charles Marling
 1921–1926: Granville Leveson-Gower, 3rd Earl Granville
 1926–1928: Sir Milne Cheetham
 1928–1933: Thomas Hohler
 1933–1935: Hugh Gurney
 1935–1939: Hon. Sir Patrick Ramsay
 1939–1940: Charles Howard Smith (expelled with his staff by the Germans on 9 April 1940)
 1945–1947: Sir Alec Randall

Ambassadors
 1947–1952: Sir Alec Randall
 1952–1956: Sir Eric Berthoud
 1956–1960: Sir Roderick Barclay
 1960–1962: Sir William Montagu-Pollock
 1962–1966: Sir John Henniker-Major
 1966–1969: Oliver Wright
 1969–1971: Sir Murray MacLehose
 1971–1976: Sir Andrew Stark
 1976–1983: Dame Anne Warburton
 1983–1986: Sir James Mellon
 1986–1988: Peter Unwin
 1989–1993: Nigel Williams
 1993–1996: Hugh James Arbuthnott
 1996-1999: Andrew Philip Foley Bache
 1999–2003: Philip Astley
 2003–2006: Sir Nicholas Browne
 2006–2008: David Frost
 2008–2012: Nick Archer
 2012–2016: Vivien Life

 2016–2020: Dominic Schroeder
 2020-: Emma Hopkins

External links
UK and Denmark, gov.uk

References

 
Denmark
United Kingdom